Golden Boy Promotions, Inc. is an American boxing promotional firm based in Los Angeles, California. The company was established in 2002 by eight-time world champion (in six divisions) Oscar De La Hoya, borrowing his nickname "Golden Boy."

History 
In 2005, Golden Boy Enterprises announced the formation of Golden Boy Partners, a company focused on urban development in Latino communities.

Golden Boy promoted the May 5, 2007, "super fight" between De La Hoya and Floyd Mayweather, at the MGM Grand, in Las Vegas, Nevada. Mayweather won the bout by a split decision. The fight once held the records for most pay-per-view buys and as the second-highest grossing fight in the history of the sport.
The company also co-promoted, with Top Rank, The Dream Match: Oscar De La Hoya Vs Manny Pacquiao on December 6, 2008.

In June 2009, Golden Boy Enterprises became embroiled in a dispute over who would fight for the WBA junior welterweight title.  On the one hand, undefeated Dmitry Salita (the WBA's No. 1-ranked 140-pounder) was told by the WBA in writing that he will face the winner of the June 27 fight between titleholder Andreas Kotelnik and Amir Khan.  On the other hand, Richard Schaefer of Golden Boy said that he had it "in writing" that that fight would face the winner of the Victor Ortíz-Marcos Maidana fight.  The WBA's top executives were unavailable for comment.  Salita was extremely upset over the prospect that he could lose what would be his first title shot.  "They're a big company", he said of Golden Boy. "They're trying to bend the rules. They're trying to kick everyone to the side and get their way, rules or no rules. When Oscar De La Hoya formed Golden Boy, he said he wanted to change boxing, to bring honor to the sport. This isn't the honorable thing to do.  This isn't good for boxing. This isn't justice. This goes against the right to pursue happiness, which is why my family immigrated to this country (from Ukraine) and why I've worked so hard. We'll see what happens." Salita ended up fighting Khan, losing by 1st-round TKO.

In January 2017, Golden Boy signed a contract to bring their boxing promotions to ESPN under a two-year deal of a total of 48 fights.

In October 2018, Canelo Álvarez (50-1-2, 34 KOs), signed an 11-fight deal with sports streaming site DAZN. The first fight under this new deal was on December 15 of that year, when Álvarez made his first appearance at the historic Madison Square Garden challenging Rocky Fielding (27-1, 15 KOs) for the WBA Super Middleweight World Championship. At the time of signing, Álvarez' deal was the richest athlete contract in sports history.

Current title holders

Notable alumni 

Devon Alexander
Canelo Álvarez
Mike Anchondo
Librado Andrade
Alfredo Angulo
Manuel Ávila
Marco Antonio Barrera
Jorge Barrios
Yan Bartelemí
Sharif Bogere
Francisco Bojado
Dominic Breazeale
Adrien Broner
Nate Campbell
Joel Casamayor
Hugo Cázares
Jermell Charlo
Luis Collazo
Juan Díaz
Billy Dib
Vicente Escobedo
Danny García
Jhonny González
Robert Guerrero
Joan Guzmán
Vivian Harris
Ricky Hatton
Mauricio Herrera
Bernard Hopkins
Demetrius Hopkins
Kingsley Ikeke
Nobuhiro Ishida
Daniel Jacobs
Yoshihiro Kamegai
Michael Katsidis
Jamie Kavanagh
Amir Khan
James Kirkland
Jeff Lacy
Erislandy Lara
Óscar Larios
Juan Lazcano
David Lemieux
Daniel Ponce De León
Jorge Linares
Marcos Maidana
Paulie Malignaggi
Patricio Manuel
Abner Mares
Rafael Márquez
Lucas Matthysse
Jorge Meléndez
Craig McEwan
Cristian Mijares
Seth Mitchell
Carlos Molina
Fernando Montiel
Érik Morales
Sergio Mora
Eric Morel
Anselmo Moreno
Shane Mosley
Enrique Ornelas
Victor Ortiz
Luis Ortiz
Kassim Ouma
Manny Pacquiao
Marco Antonio Peribán
Lamont Peterson
Peter Quillin
David Rodela
John Ruiz
José Santa Cruz
Léo Santa Cruz
Guillermo Saputo
Ishe Smith
Errol Spence
Humberto Soto
Keith Thurman
Austin Trout
Edwin Valero
Francisco Vargas
Israel Vázquez
Gerald Washington
Deontay Wilder
Winky Wright

Mixed Martial Arts (MMA) promotion
In 2018, De La Hoya added mixed martial arts matches to his roster, as Golden Boy MMA, beginning with a 2018 trilogy bout between long-time rivals Chuck Liddell and Tito Ortiz. The inaugural event took place on November 24, 2018 in California, and saw Ortiz dispatch Liddell by first-round knockout.

When the full card was first announced in October 2018, The Ultimate Fighter 3: Team Ortiz vs. Team Shamrock alum Kendall Grove was scheduled to face Andre Walker. However, this bout failed to materialize.

UFC alum Tom Gallicchio was scheduled to face Jason Manly in a Welterweight bout. However, the bout was cancelled when Gallicchio suffered a staph infection.

Kenneth Bergh and Jorge Gonzales were announced to fight in a Light Heavyweight bout. However, the bout failed to materialize. Juliana Miller was initially scheduled to face Jasmine Pouncy. However, Pouncy was replaced by Sidney Trillo.

Affliction: Trilogy
In 2008, Golden Boy Promotions and Affliction Clothing started a mixed martial arts (MMA) promotion, aggressively pursuing free agents. The promotion was cancelled 10 days prior to its third Affliction: Trilogy PPV event, featuring Fedor Emelianenko and Josh Barnett, in July 2009, subsequent to Barnett having tested positive for anabolic steroids, in accordance with the California State Athletic Commission, when a qualified replacement fighter could not be secured in time.

Liddell vs. Ortiz 3

Golden Boy Promotions: Liddell vs. Ortiz 3 was a MMA event that took place on November 24, 2018 at The Forum in Inglewood, California.

Background

For the main event, Chuck Liddell's reported payout was $250,000 (plus a percentage of pay-per-view buys) and Tito Ortiz's payout was $200,000 (plus a percentage of pay-per-view buys).

Results

See also
Mayweather Promotions

References

External links
Golden Boy Promotions

 
Professional boxing organizations
Mixed martial arts organizations
Boxing promoters
Sports event promotion companies